Willoughby Bertie  may refer to:
Willoughby Bertie, 3rd Earl of Abingdon (1692–1760)
Willoughby Bertie, 4th Earl of Abingdon (1740–1799)